The House of Poposki family, or House of Popovci is a house in the village of Vevčani, Vevčani Municipality, Macedonia. The house belongs to the Poposki family and the building is registered as a Cultural Heritage of Macedonia.

Architecture 

The house of Popovci is a house with high architectural and structural expression with a characteristic and specific typology.

Gallery

See also
 House of Kostojčinoski family - a cultural heritage site
 House of Duckinoski family - a cultural heritage site
 House of Korunoski family - a cultural heritage site
 House of Ḱitanoski family - a cultural heritage site
 House of Pešinoski family - a cultural heritage site
 House of Pluškoski family - a cultural heritage site
 House of Kalajdžieski family - a cultural heritage site
 House of Gogoski family - a cultural heritage site
 House of Daskaloski family - a cultural heritage site
 Kostojčinoski fulling mill and gristmill - a cultural heritage site

References

External links 

Houses in Vevčani
Cultural heritage of North Macedonia